Suigu may refer to several places in Estonia:

Suigu, Lääne-Viru County, village in Vinni Parish, Lääne-Viru County
Suigu, Pärnu County, village in Are Parish, Pärnu County